Branchiostegus doliatus, the ribbed tilefish, is a species of marine ray-finned fish, a tilefish belonging to the family Malacanthidae. It is found in the Western Indian Ocean: including Maputo, from Mozambique to Durban, South Africa; and also in Mauritius and Reunion islands; and off Madagascar.

References

Dooley, J.K., 1978. Systematics and biology of the tilefishes (Perciformes: Branchiostegidae and Malacanthidae) with descriptions of two new species. NOAA Tech. Rep. NMFS Circ. No. 411:1-78.

Malacanthidae
Taxa named by Georges Cuvier
Fish described in 1830